Kwang-seok, also spelled Kwang-suk or Gwang-seok, is a Korean masculine given name. The meaning differs based on the hanja used to write each syllable of the name. There are 13 hanja with the reading "kwang" and 20 hanja with the reading "seok" on the South Korean government's official list of hanja which may be used in given names.

People with this name include:
Kim Kwang-seok (born 1936), South Korean martial artist, founder of the Sib Pal Gi Association
Kim Kwang-seok (1964–1996), South Korean folk rock singer
Jung Kwang-seok (born 1970), South Korean football player and manager
Lee Kwang-suk (born 1975), South Korean footballer
Kim Gwang-seok (wrestler) (born 1977), South Korean Greco-Roman wrestler
Kim Gwang-seok (born 1983), South Korean footballer

See also
List of Korean given names

References

Korean masculine given names